Solomon Loeb (June 29, 1828 – December 12, 1903) was a German-born American banker and businessman. He was a merchant in textiles and later a banker with Kuhn, Loeb & Co.

Biography
His father, a devout Jew, had been a small corn- and wine-dealer in Worms, which belonged to the Grand Duchy of Hesse and by Rhine. Solomon Loeb immigrated to the United States in 1849.  He settled in Cincinnati with the textiles merchant Kuhn, Netter & Co. He moved to New York City in 1865 and with his partner, Abraham Kuhn, started the banking house of Kuhn, Loeb and Co.  His second born son, James Loeb, joined the bank in 1888 (and left in 1901). Solomon Loeb gradually retired from running the business but left Kuhn, Loeb & Co. only in 1899. He then started to move into the real estate business. In addition, he was also a generous philanthropist.

Among his donations was the Hebrew Charities Building that formerly stood at Second Avenue and 21st Street in New York City.

Family 

 Solomon Loeb, married Fanny Kuhn, sister of Abraham Kuhn, and later Betty Gallenberg.
 Therese Loeb (1854–1933), married Jacob Schiff (1847–1920), banker
 Frieda Schiff (1876–1958), married Felix M. Warburg (1871–1937), banker.
 See Warburg family.
 Morris Loeb (1863–1912), chemist, married Edna Kuhn (1866–1951), the daughter of Samuel and Regina Wise Kuhn. Samuel Kuhn was a brother of Abraham Kuhn.

 Guta Loeb (1865–1956), married Isaac Newton Seligman (1855–1917), banker
 Margaret Valentine Seligman, married to Sam A. Lewisohn (1884–1951), banker, son of Adolph Lewisohn (1849–1938)
 James Loeb (1867–1933), banker
 Nina Loeb (1870–1945), married Paul Warburg (1868–1932), banker.
 James Warburg (1896–1969), banker
 See Warburg family.

References

Further reading

External links 
 Solomon Loeb's beginnings in Cincinnati
  Loeb Collection was a gift to the Cincinnati Library
 Loeb, Solomon from The Columbia Encyclopedia, Sixth Edition.  2001–05
 Loeb Family Tree

1828 births
1903 deaths
American bankers
American Reform Jews
American people of German-Jewish descent
American real estate businesspeople
Businesspeople from New York City
Businesspeople from Ohio
German bankers
German emigrants to the United States
German philanthropists
German Reform Jews
Jewish American philanthropists
Jews and Judaism in Cincinnati
Loeb family
People from Rhenish Hesse
People from Worms, Germany
Warburg family
Philanthropists from New York (state)
19th-century American philanthropists
19th-century American businesspeople